General Nils Per Robert Swedlund (16 May 1898 – 28 June 1965) was a Swedish Army officer who was Supreme Commander of the Swedish Armed Forces from 1951 to 1961. He was one of the strongest advocates for a Swedish nuclear weapons program. He worked hard to convince the government that they were necessary.

Early life
Swedlund was born on 16 May 1898 in Gävle, Sweden, the son of major Gustav Swedlund and his wife Ellen (née Reuterskiöld) and brother of the archivist and historian . His nephew was the Chief of the Costal Fleet, Rear Admiral Sten Swedlund. Nils Swedlund passed studentexamen at the Högre allmänna läroverket in Gävle in 1917.

Career
Swedlund was commissioned as an officer with the rank of second lieutenant in 1919 and was assigned to Hälsinge Regiment (I 14). Swedlund became captain in the General Staff Corps in 1933 and conducted rehearsals and was a teacher at the Royal Swedish Army Staff College from 1934 to 1938 and from 1940 to 1942. He was promoted to major in 1940 and lieutenant colonel in 1942. Swedlund was head of department at the Defence Staff in 1942 and was appointed vice chief and section chief in the Defense Staff in 1944. He was promoted to colonel the same year.

During World War II Swedlund was involved in the Swedish training of Norwegian police troops. Swedlund was then commanding officer of Norrbotten Regiment (I 19) from 1946 to 1947 and the Chief of the Defence Staff from 1947 to 1951. He was promoted to major general in 1948, lieutenant general in 1951 and finally general in 1951. Swedlund was the Supreme Commander from 1951 to 1961. As Supreme Commander Swedlund was a strong supporter of nuclear weapons and a driving force in continuing the Swedish nuclear weapons program. He regarded them as necessary for the Swedish defence and worked hard to gain the government's support on the issue. He was also involved in the secret operations for the formation of a Swedish resistance movement in the event of a Soviet invasion, the so-called Stay-behind movement.

Personal life
On 14 April 1927 in Halmstad, Swedlund married Brita Alexandra Broberg (26 November 1901 in Eftra, Halland – 17 July 1993 in Danderyd), the daughter of major Carl Alfred Broberg and Ebba Susanna Ståhle.

Death
Swedlund died during a sailing trip on the Sea of Åland on 28 June 1965. His death place was indicated as Mariehamn in Åland. Swedlund was living in Saltsjöbaden at the time of his death. He was buried at Skogsö Cemetery in Saltsjöbaden.

Dates of rank
1919 – Second lieutenant
19?? – Lieutenant
1933 – Captain
1940 – Major
1942 – Lieutenant colonel
1944 – Colonel
1948 – Major general
1951 – Lieutenant general
1951 – General

Awards and decorations

Swedish
  Knight and Commander of the Orders of His Majesty the King (Order of the Seraphim) (21 November 1963)
  Commander Grand Cross of the Order of the Sword
  Commander of the Order of the Polar Star
  Knight of the Order of Vasa

Foreign
    Grand Cross of the Order of the Dannebrog
   Grand Cross of the Order of the White Rose of Finland
   Grand Cross of the Order of St. Olav (1 July 1954)
   Grand Decoration of Honour of the Order of Merit of the Austrian Republic
   King Christian X's Liberty Medal
 Commemorative medal for humanitarian work (Medaljen för humanitär verksamhet)

Honours
Member of the Royal Swedish Academy of War Sciences (1943)
Honorary member of the Royal Swedish Society of Naval Sciences (1952)

References

1898 births
1965 deaths
People from Gävle
Swedish Army generals
Nuclear weapons programme of Sweden
Commanders Grand Cross of the Order of the Sword
Commanders of the Order of the Polar Star
Knights of the Order of Vasa
Grand Crosses of the Order of the Dannebrog
Recipients of the Grand Decoration for Services to the Republic of Austria
Members of the Royal Swedish Academy of War Sciences
Chiefs of the Defence Staff (Sweden)